Jastrebarsko, colloquially known as Jaska, is a town in Zagreb County, Croatia.

History

Antiquity 
In 1865, remnants of a Roman settlement were uncovered in Repišće, Klinča Sela, a village in Jastrebarsko metropolitan area. Further archeological investigation in the late 20th century classified them as a villa rustica and a necropolis consisting of six tumuli, both dating to the early Roman Empire period. The remnants are deemed to be the westernmost group of Noric-Pannonian tumuli and they make a very rare occasion of tombstones located directly on top of tumuli, which is in the rest of Croatia recorded only in Donji Čehi. The location of this archeological site on the fluvial terraces of the local Konjava stream is attributed to the peaceful state of the central Roman Empire, which in turn led to formation of settlements in river valleys.

This is attributed to the loss of stability in the Pannonian region and in the Empire overall. A necropolis belonging to Sveta Marija was found on the small valley of Popov Dol and small items were excavated therefrom. Those were mostly bronze bracelets and glass chalices, items that Romans buried with their deceased. Two similar sites were found in the vicinity: Pavlovčani and Plešivica pass.

Modern settlement 
This can be attributed to the practicers of falconry (pl. ), who were active in the area of southwest Zagreb County. A remnant of falconry can also be found in the Jastrebarsko coat of arms, which features a yellow goshawk on a blue blackground. The first mention of this name is found in a 1249 document of the Croatian ban Stjepan Gutkeled as "lands of Jastraburcza". The town is therein described as a trade and judicial center. In 1257 Croato-Hungarian King Bela IV awarded Jastrebarsko the status of a "free royal trading center" by the means of a golden bull. This status helped Jastrebarsko combat the interests of local feudal lords until the abolishment of the feudal system by ban Josip Jelačić in 1848.

From 1518 to 1848 Jastrebarsko is heavily influenced by the Croato-Hungarian noble family Erdödy. The bans Petar II and Toma II Erdödy were known for their victories against the spreading Ottoman Empire. Toma, son of Petar, won the 1593 Battle of Sisak, a major and decisive battle in the Ottomans' centuries-long occupation of Balkans. Later, in 1809 during the expansion of Napoleon's First French Empire, Jastrebarsko was for a short time incorporated in the Illyrian Provinces. This lasted until Summer 1813, when the French retreated from Croatia.

Jastrebarsko started to rapidly develop following the 1848 abolishment of feudalism. The Zagreb–Karlovac railway was built in 1865, providing the town with a major source of employment. The local elementary school, founded in the 17th century, was augmented by a number of other cultural, social and sports organization, including a library, the singing society "Javor", association of tamburica players, a volunteer fire brigade and a theater and others.

In the late 19th and early 20th century, Jastrebarsko was a district capital in the Zagreb County of the Kingdom of Croatia-Slavonia.

The town was the site of a concentration camp for Serb children operated by the authorities of the Independent State of Croatia during World War II.

Geography 
Jastrebarsko is located in the Prigorje region of Central Croatia, built around the Reka Creek (reka is Kajkavian dialect word for river). On the west, Jastrebarsko is bordered by the Žumberak Mountain, a mountain range spreading through southeast Slovenia and southwest Prigorje, specifically Žumberak municipality and City of Samobor.

Transport 
Jastrebarsko lies on both Zagreb–Split (Adriatic-Ionian highway) and Zagreb-Rijeka (Corridor Vb) rail and road corridors. There is a highway exit near Jastrebarsko on the A1 highway, located between the Lučko interchange near Zagreb and the Karlovac interchange. This  stretch is the oldest modern highway in Croatia, dating back to 1970. The Zagreb–Karlovac–Rijeka magistral railroad M202, part of the Pan-European corridor Vb, passes through Jastrebarsko. Jastrebarsko is served by a high-speed tilting train running between Zagreb and Rijeka and commuter trains operating between the town and Zagreb. The city administration has called for a traffic study in 2007 by Ivan Dadić, a Croatian traffic expert, to solve the transport problems riddling Jastrebarsko's roads. Preliminary opinion by Dadić called for construction of four additional interchanges on the Zagreb–Karlovac stretch that would stop Jastrebarsko from being the bottleneck exit for all commuters living on the A1 corridor.

Climate 
The climate of Jastrebarsko is classified as maritime temperate with a slightly drier winter (Cfwbx in Köppen climate classification system). The city experiences four separate seasons. Winters are mild and summers are cool and the dry season spans through the winter and early spring. Record temperatures have been encountered in July 1983 and January 1985. There are scientifically documented claims that the global warming affects the climate in Jastrebarsko by increasing average yearly temperature by 1.2 °C (2.1 °F).

Demographics 

In the 2011 census, the city of Jastrebarsko has a total population of 15,866. 5,493 of whom live in the settlement of Jastrebarsko itself (naselje). The settlement (naselje) of Jastrebarsko encompasses nearly a third of the total population of the town, but less than a tenth of the total area. The records from the earlier censuses show a decrease in total population from a high of 17,895 in 1991, although the population of the seat settlement has been continuously increasing since at least 1981.

Jastrebarsko metropolitan area includes the City of Jastrebarsko and three adjacent municipalities: Klinča Sela, Krašić and Žumberak.

Settlements

The settlements in the city administrative area are:

 Belčići, population 91
 Brebrovac, population 74
 Brezari, population 66
 Breznik Plešivički, population 123
 Bukovac Svetojanski, population 85
 Celine, population 68
 Crna Mlaka, population 30
 Cvetković, population 616
 Čabdin, population 139
 Čeglje, population 373
 Črnilovec, population 123
 Dolanjski Jarak, population 32
 Domagović, population 541
 Donja Reka, population 349
 Donji Desinec, population 799
 Draga Svetojanska, population 153
 Dragovanščak, population 101
 Goljak, population 59
 Gorica Svetojanska, population 116
 Gornja Kupčina, population 148
 Gornja Reka, population 359
 Gornji Desinec, population 651
 Grabarak, population 0
 Gračac Slavetićki, population 5
 Guci Draganički, population 302
 Hrastje Plešivičko, population 182
 Hrašća, population 86
 Ivančići, population 198
 Izimje, population 221
 Jastrebarsko, population 5,493
 Jurjevčani, population 99
 Kupeć Dol, population 97
 Lanišće, population 0
 Lokošin Dol, population 95
 Malunje, population 211
 Miladini, population 58
 Novaki Petrovinski, population 292
 Orešje Okićko, population 16
 Paljugi, population 10
 Pavlovčani, population 290
 Pesak, population 13
 Petrovina, population 246
 Plešivica, population 292
 Prhoć, population 235
 Prilipje, population 225
 Prodin Dol, population 97
 Rastoki, population 109
 Redovje, population 29
 Slavetić, population 84
 Srednjak, population 45
 Stankovo, population 370
 Špigelski Breg, population 0
 Tihočaj, population 3
 Toplice, population 96
 Vlaškovec, population 120
 Volavje, population 398
 Vranov Dol, population 137
 Vukšin Šipak, population 310
 Zdihovo, population 306

Notable inhabitants 

Jastrebarsko was home to two important Croatian Roman Catholic cardinals: Aloysius Stepinac (1898–1960) and Franjo Kuharić (1919–2002). Aloysius Stepinac was born in Krašić municipality in Jastrebarsko metropolitan area and made Archbishop of Zagreb in 1937 and later cardinal in 1952. In 1946, Stepinac was sentenced by a Yugoslav court to 16 years in prison for alleged collaborating with the Nazis. He was released five years later and died in home confinement. He was buried in the Zagreb Cathedral and Franjo Šeper succeeded him as the new Archbishop of Zagreb. The other cardinal was Franjo Kuharić, also from Krašić. He became a priest in 1945 and succeeded Šeper (then already a cardinal) as the Archbishop of Zagreb in 1970. In 1983 pope John Paul II chose him as a cardinal. Kuharić remained on that duty until his retirement in 1997.

Two influential Croatian politicians are known to have lived in Jastrebarsko. 
Vladko Maček, a Croatian politician from the first half of the 20th century also hails from Jastrebarsko. Born in a nearby village, Kupinec, Maček led the Croatian Peasant Party fighting for the independence of Croatia since the assassination of Stjepan Radić until World War II and the establishment of the Independent State of Croatia by the Axis powers which defeated the Kingdom of Yugoslavia in 1941. 
Ante Starčević, termed "Father of the Croatian homeland", fought for the independence and the democratical re-establishment of the medieval Kingdom of Croatia, opposing the Hungarian sympathizer and ban of Croatia Khuen-Héderváry. He lived in Jastrebarsko for seven years while working in a law practice.

Boris Klemenić was mayor of the town for eight years.

References

Endnotes 
Also mentioned as Gonjeva by Gregl.
Although Škrabe refers to an estimate of 600 years, the period of Jastrebarsko's free royal trading center actually could have lasted only 591 years. See Gjuro Szabo's book Stari Zagreb for a detailed explanation of free royal towns of Croatia.

External links 

 
Zagreb County official website 

Cities and towns in Croatia
Populated places in Zagreb County
Zagreb County (former)
Populated places established in the 13th century
Spa towns in Croatia